Laura Belinda Charlotte Jewry (married name Laura Valentine, pen names Mrs. S. Valentine and Aunt Louisa; 1814–1899), was a Victorian English writer primarily known for her children literature. Her work was often produced in children series including Aunt Louisa's Toy Books, Aunt Louisa’s Big Picture Series, and The Young Folk's Shakespeare Series.

Biography
Laura Belinda Charlotte Jewry was born at the Victory in England. Her father, Admiral Jewry, served in the English navy. At an early age, she connected with the Lord Elphinstone family. She spent her maiden life in India till she married Reverend Richard Valentine, a clergyman of the Church of England. Within 12 months of their marriage, she was widowed.

Her literature often was educational, told of travel, or described the London scene. As an adult novelist, Laura Valentine specialized in florid historical romance. Her main novels were Kirkholme Priory (1847), The Vassal (1850), and the Cup and the Lip (1851). Valentine expressed an expertise in Shakespeare, editing "The Works of William Shakespeare" and creating a number of children's versions of Shakespeare plays including The Merchant of Venice and The Tempest. Professionally, Valentine was one of the chief editors of Frederick Warne & Co and the sole editor of Girl's Home Book and The Chandos Classics. Most of Valentine's work was published through Frederick Warne & Co and T. C. Newby.

Valentine died at the age of 84 still an active writer. She was survived only by her sister Mary Jewry for five or six years.

Bibliography 
Beatrice; or, Six Years of Childhood and Youth (William Tegg), 1859
Nelly, the Gypsy Girl (Routledge, Warne & Routledge), 1860
The Girl's Own Book; by Mrs. Child; a new edition revised by Mrs. R. Valentine (Miss Laura Jewry) 468 pp. (William Tegg), 1863
The Knights Ransom (Frederick Warne and Co.), 1870
Aunt Louisa's London Toy Books: Lily Sweet-Briar's Birthday (Frederick Warne and Co.), ca. 1870
Aunt Louisa's London Toy Books: Sea-Side (Frederick Warne and Co.), ca. 1870
Aunt Louisa's London Toy Books: The Birthday Party (Frederick Warne and Co.), ca. 1870
Aunt Louisa's Nursery Favourite, (Frederick Warne and Co.), ca. 1870
Aunt Louisa's big picture series: Home games for little girls (McLoughlin Brothers), 1870
Aunt Louisa's big picture series: Santa Claus and his works (McLoughlin Brothers), 1872
Uncle Ned's toy books: Play time stories (McLoughlin Bro's), 187?
Daring and Doing, A Book for Boys (Frederick Warne and Co.), 1874
Aunt Louisa's Fairy Legends (McLaughlin Brothers), 1875
Aunt Louisa's London Gift Book (Frederick Warne and Co.), ca. 1875
Aunt Louisa's Welcome Gift (Frederick Warne and Co.), ca. 1875
Aunt Louisa's London Toy Books: The Zoological gardens hyænas, stag, jaguar, fox, otter, camel (Frederick Warne and Co.), ca. 1875
Rhymes for the Little Ones (Frederick Warne & Co.), ca. 1880
Home and Country Pets (Frederick Warne), ca. 1880s
World-Wide Fables (McLoughlin Brothers), 1880
Aunt Louisa's Keepsake (Frederick Warne and Co./Scribner, Welford and Co.), ca. 1880
Aunt Louisa's comicalities (Frederick Warne & Co.), ca. 1880
Aunt Louisa's London Toy Books: Hop O'my Thumb (Frederick Warne and Co.), ca. 1880
Aunt Louisa's Stories of Old (Frederick Warne and Co.), ca. 1890
Aunt Louisa's First Book for Children (Frederick Warne & Co.), 1902 (Illustrated by Louis Wain and others)
Eastern Tales by Many Story Tellers (Frederick Warne and Co.), 1902
Aunt Louisa's Book of Common Things (F. Warne & Co. Ltd), 1920
Aunt Louisa's Alphabet book (Frederick Warne and Co.)
Aunt Louisa's Bible Picture Book
Aunt Louisa's Golden Gift (Frederick Warne and Co.), 1878
Aunt Louisa's Oft Told Tales (Mcloughlin Bros.) New York, 1875
Aunt Louisa's Old Nursery Friends
Aunt Louisa's Sparkling Gems  Mcloughlin Bros., 1866
Aunt Louisa's Wee, Wee Stories Mcloughlin Bros., New York, 1883
Aunt Louisa's Welcome Guest comprising: My favourites, Rover's dinner party, Our boys and girls (Frederick Warne and Co.), 1886?
Aunt Louisa's Welcome Visitor comprising New Year's Eve; The kingdom of the greedy; Frisky the Squirrel; Dick Whittington (Frederick Warne and Co.), 187?
Aunt Louisa's London toy books: Hector the Dog (Frederick Warne & Co.) ca. 1870
Joe and Ned
Little Peace
Robinson Crusoe
Toto

References

External links

 
 
 

1814 births
1899 deaths
19th-century British women writers
19th-century British writers
English children's writers